Spanish Harlem is the debut album by Ben E. King, released by Atco Records as an LP in 1961. The title track and "Amor" were released as singles. The latter was released as "Amor Amor" on London. Stan Applebaum was the arranger.

The title track peaked at No. 10 on the Billboard Hot 100. The album peaked at No. 30 on the UK Albums chart.

Track listing
"Amor" (Gabriel Ruíz, Sunny Skylar, Ricardo López Méndez) - [3:02]
"Sway" (Norman Gimbel, Gabriel Ruíz) - [2:18]
"Come Closer to Me" (Al Stewart, Osvaldo Farrés) - [2:35]
"Perfidia" (Alberto Dominguez, Milton Leeds) - [2:04]
"Granada" (Agustín Lara, Dorothy Dodd) - [2:27]
"Sweet and Gentle" (George Thorn, Otilio del Portal, Martin Ledyard) - [2:24]
"Perhaps, Perhaps, Perhaps" (Joe Davis, Osvaldo Farrés) - [2:12]
"Frenesí" (Alberto Dominguez, Leonard Whitcup) - [3:09]
"Souvenir of Mexico" (Mort Shuman, Doc Pomus) - [2:24]
"Bésame Mucho" (Sunny Skylar, Consuelo Velázquez) - [2:57]
"Love Me, Love Me"  (Ben E. King) - [2:37]
"Spanish Harlem" (Jerry Leiber, Phil Spector) - [2:53]

Personnel
Ben E. King – vocals
George Duvivier – double bass
Al Caiola – guitar
Ernest Hayes – piano
Gary Chester – drums
Charlie Margulis – trumpet
Ray Barretto – percussion
George Barnes – guitar
Urbie Green – trombone
Stan Applebaum - arrangements
Technical
Allen Vogel, Loring Eutemey - artwork

References

1961 debut albums
Ben E. King albums
Atco Records albums
Albums produced by Jerry Leiber
Albums produced by Mike Stoller